Dunkineely is a small village and townland in County Donegal, Ireland. It is a small single street village with a population of around 300 in its surroundings. There is a dun on the edge of the village from which Dunkineely derives its name. The village lies at the top of St John's Point, a narrow peninsula jutting seven miles into Donegal Bay.

It is the larger of two villages in the parish of Killaghtee, the other being Bruckless, now the location of the Roman Catholic parish church. Nearby is the ancient parish church of Killaghtee. In the old graveyard there is one of the oldest Celtic crosses in Ireland, the Killaghtee Cross.

The population is a mix of Roman Catholic and Protestant (Methodist and Church of Ireland).  Employment in the area relies on seasonal fishing and mixed agriculture as well as service and light industry in the nearby towns of Killybegs and Donegal town.

Facilities
The town has two local industries in the village that comprises a fish processing factory and architectural design and fabrication factory. Services in Dunkineely include a  shop, cafe, car dealership, a fishing tackle shop/florist, John's barber shop, auctioneers, 3 bars (Mac's Bar, Mac Laughlin's Bar, McIntyre's Bar), a radio communications shop and a budget accommodation hostel. There are several B&B's in the locality. McIntyre's bar hosts a weekly Irish traditional music session. There is also a National School, Community Centre, GAA pitch and soccer pitch.

Sport
The local Gaelic Athletic Association club is named Naomh Ultan. The local football team is Dunkineely Celtic.

Transport
Dunkineely railway station opened on 18 August 1893, and closed on 1 January 1960.
Dunkineely lies on the main N56 road between Donegal Town and Killybegs. A regular bus service 
operates along this route.

Festival
Every year in the month of July or August the town hosts a 3-day weekend Summer Street Festival. Events over the years have included a parade through the town, soap box derby races, live bands, pub quizzes, sporting competitions, classic car show, wheelie bin races and digger and tractor driving competitions.

Famous people
 Brian Goold-Verschoyle (1912-1942) - spy for the Soviet Union and victim of Joseph Stalin's Gulag. One of three Irish people to lose their lives as part of the Great Purge.
 Joseph Brennan (1912-1980) - former TD and Ceann Comhairle

See also
 List of populated places in Ireland

References

External links
 Dunkineely town page

Towns and villages in County Donegal
Townlands of County Donegal